Jada Benn Torres is an American genetic anthropologist and Associate Professor of Anthropology at Vanderbilt University. She serves as Director of the Laboratory of Genetic Anthropology and Biocultural Studies. Her research considers the genetic ancestry of African and Indigenous people

Early life and education 
Benn Torres' parents are from Trinidad. She has said that the childhood stories her father told her about her ancestors inspired her career in anthropology. Benn Torres earned her undergraduate degree in anthropology at the University of Notre Dame. She moved to the University of New Mexico for her graduate studies, where she investigated African ancestry throughout the Anglophone Caribbean region. After earning her doctorate, Benn Torres moved to University of Chicago.

Research and career 
In 2008 Benn Torres joined the University of Notre Dame, where she was the first molecular anthropologist member of faculty. Molecular anthropology At Notre Dame Benn Torres used genetics to study the distribution of disease across different populations. She studied why African-Americans were more likely to develop uterine fibroids at a younger age than women from other populations. She moved to the Anthropology Department at Vanderbilt University in 2016. Benn Torres combines genetic epidemiology and anthropology to better understand health disparities.

Awards and honours 
2015 Gabriel Ward Lasker Award

2017 Vanderbilt University Provost Research Studios

Selected publications

References 

Living people
Year of birth missing (living people)
University of New Mexico alumni
Vanderbilt University faculty
American anthropologists
American women anthropologists
American women academics